Xing Yu (born 8 January 1996) is a Chinese footballer who plays for Chengdu Rongcheng.

Club career
Xing Yu started his professional football career in July 2014 when he was promoted to China League One side Chengdu Blades's first team squad. He moved to Chinese Super League side Guangzhou R&F in 2015 after Chengdu's dissolution. In August 2016, he was loaned to Hong Kong Premier League side R&F, which was the satellite team of Guangzhou R&F. He made his senior debut on 24 September 2016 in a 2–0 away defeat against BC Glory Sky. He shared the starting position with Long Wenhao, playing 12 matches for R&F in the 2016–17 season.

Xing Yu would return to the Chinese leagues where he joined second tier club Qingdao Huanghai and spent the 2018 league season in the team's reserves, however the following campaign he was included in the first team where he would make his debut for the club in a league game on 29 June 2019 in a 1-1 draw against Nantong Zhiyun. Throughout the season he would fight for the first-choice goalkeeping spot against Zhao Shi, eventually being the first-choice goalkeeper that lead the team to win the 2019 China League One and promotion to the top tier. The following season the club would bring in Liu Zhenli as the first-choice goalkeeper and Xing would join second tier football club Chengdu Rongcheng as their reserve choice goalkeeper as the club gained promotion to the top tier at the end of the 2021 league campaign.

Career statistics
.

Honours

Club
Qingdao Huanghai
China League One: 2019

References

External links

1996 births
Living people
Chinese footballers
Footballers from Chongqing
Chengdu Tiancheng F.C. players
Guangzhou City F.C. players
R&F (Hong Kong) players
Qingdao F.C. players
Association football goalkeepers
China League One players
Chinese Super League players
Hong Kong Premier League players